Matias Niuta (born 9 March 2001) is a Finnish professional footballer who plays for FC Reipas as a midfielder.

References

2001 births
Living people
Finnish footballers
FC Lahti players
Reipas Lahti players
Nurmijärven Jalkapalloseura players
Kakkonen players
Veikkausliiga players
Association football midfielders